Nabeel Shaukat Ali (born 29 August 1989) is a Pakistani singer. He was the winner of Sur Kshetra, a singing talent show – the musical battle between teams of two neighboring countries: Pakistan and India aired simulcast on Geo TV, Sahara One, Colors TV, AAG TV as well as Rishtey.

Personal life
He and his family resided in the UAE but came back to Pakistan, so that Nabeel could learn music. He followed the veteran singer Mohammed Rafi during his childhood. All of this events were revealed by Nabeel himself when he attended the show Rewind with Samina Peerzada as a guest.

Career
Nabeel Shaukat Ali always wanted to be a singer from his childhood. His first appearance was in Azme Alishan National Song Competition (Season 2), in which he performed in front of top Pakistani musicians like Strings and Arshad Mehmood and was declared the winner in 2011. 

After that, he participated in the 2012 singing competition Sur Kshetra. There were 5 finalist chairs at the start of the show. Sara Raza Khan was the first contestant to sit on a finalist chair based on the decision of the jury. Mulazim Hussain became the second finalist after winning the face off. Yashraj Kapil sat on the third finalist chair as the captain Himesh Reshammiya left it up to the judges to decide the third finalist from his team. Budhaditya Mukherjee became the fourth finalist after winning the face off for the fourth chair. The battle for the fifth chair proved to be the most exciting as Nabeel from Pakistan and Diljaan from 'Team India' went head to head in the face-off. There was a lot of drama after the face-off as both the contestants sang really well and it became very tough for the jury members to decide who should be the fifth finalist. Asha Bhosle wanted Diljaan to be the finalist, while Abida Parveen wanted Nabeel to be the fifth finalist. The neutral judge Runa Laila refused to take the decision and threatened to walk out of the show. After much drama, it was finally decided that there would be six finalists instead of five and hence both Diljaan and Nabeel made it to the finals.

In the Grand Finale, Nabeel Shaukat Ali won the title by beating Diljaan in the face-off round on account of his versatility.

Reality show

Discography

References

External links 
Nabeel Shaukat Ali on IMDb website

1989 births
Living people
Pakistani male singers
Participants in Pakistani reality television series
Singing talent show winners
Punjabi people
Singers from Faisalabad
Coke Studio (Pakistani TV program)